The Scout and Guide movement in Portugal is served by several organizations:
 Federação Escotista de Portugal, member of the World Organization of the Scout Movement, a federation of:
 Associação dos Escoteiros de Portugal (AEP)
 Corpo Nacional de Escutas - Escutismo Católico Português (CNE)
 Associação Guias de Portugal (AGP), WAGGGS member.
 Associação das Guias e Escuteiros da Europa (AGEE; Guide and Scout Association of Europe), UIGSE member.
 Comité Português de Amizade dos Antigos Escoteiros e Guias (AEG) - member of International Scout and Guide Fellowship which includes
 Fraternal Escotista de Portugal (FAEP; former members of AEP, and any other adults)
 Associação de Antigas Guias (AAG; former Girl Guides)
 Fraternidade de Nuno Álvares (FNA; former members of CNE)
 Associação Escoteiros Independentes da Moita (AEIM; non-aligned)
 União dos Escoteiros Portugueses (UEP; non-aligned, created after breakaway of AEP, but with former scouts of other Associations )

International Scouting units in Portugal
The Transatlantic Council of the Boy Scouts of America serves American Boy Scouts in Lisbon and in the Azores.